Elias Shaheen or Elias Chahine (in Arabic الياس شاهين) (born on 20 July 1914 in Ebrine, Lebanon - died on 5 December 1991) was the first bishop of the Maronite Church in Canada and in 1985 was appointed Archbishop of the Maronite Catholic Eparchy of Saint Maron of Montreal.

Life
Shaheen was born in Ebrine, Lebanon. On March 25, 1939, he was consecrated priest.  He was appointed first Maronite bishop of the Maronite Catholic Eparchy of Saint Maron of Montreal on August 27, 1982. Maronite Patriarch of Antioch, Cardinal Anthony Peter Khoraish, consecrated him bishop on November 7, 1982 and his co-consecrators were Archeparch Francis Mansour Zayek of Brooklyn and the Auxiliary bishop of Antioch, Bishop Roland Aboujaoudé. On March 13, 1985 Elias Shaheen was appointed Archbishop of Montréal. On November 23, 1990 he became Archbishop emeritus and was until his death on 5 December 1991. Shaheen was succeeded by Bishop Georges Abi-Saber, OLM.

References

External links 
 Archbishop Elias Shaheen (Chahine) [Catholic-Hierarchy]
 Eparchy of Saint-Maron de Montréal, Canada (Maronite Rite)

1914 births
1991 deaths
Lebanese Maronites
20th-century Maronite Catholic bishops
Lebanese emigrants to Canada